Antonio Boselli (born circa 1470 - 1480 and died 1527 - 1532) was an Italian painter of the Renaissance period, active mainly in Bergamo.

Biography
He was born in San Giovanni Bianco in the Val Brembana, and painted from 1495 to 1527, in a style more reminiscent of the Quattrocento. In Bergamo, he painted the Saints Peter, Paul, and Luke for the church of San Cristoforo. He also painted a Virgin, St Peter, and Magdalen (1495) in a church in Ponteranica. he painted in Romacolo and Zogno. He painted for the church of San Cristoforo, Seriate.

References

1536 deaths
15th-century Italian painters
Italian male painters
16th-century Italian painters
Painters from Bergamo
Italian Renaissance painters
Year of birth unknown
Year of birth uncertain